Kharis Kharisovich Yunichev (7 August 1931 – 12 February 2006) was the first Soviet male swimmer to win an Olympic medal – at the 1956 Summer Olympics he finished third in the 200 m breaststroke event. The same year he set two European records. Yunichev was a versatile sportsman: he won three national titles, two in breaststroke swimming (1951 and 1956) and one in water polo (1952), and also competed nationally in diving. In the 1950s he was serving in the Air Force and training in the Moscow Oblast. Since the 2002, regional swimming competitions are held in Sochi in his memory.

References

1931 births
2006 deaths
Russian male swimmers
Male breaststroke swimmers
Olympic swimmers of the Soviet Union
Swimmers at the 1956 Summer Olympics
Olympic bronze medalists for the Soviet Union
Olympic bronze medalists in swimming
Medalists at the 1956 Summer Olympics
Soviet male swimmers